Green Spring Run is an  tributary stream of the North Branch Potomac River in Hampshire County in the U.S. state of West Virginia. Green Spring Run rises in Greenwood Hollow north of Springfield and meanders northeast through Green Spring Valley. The South Branch Valley Railroad and Green Spring Road (West Virginia Secondary Route 1) run parallel to the stream. It runs through the community of Green Spring, from which the stream takes its name. From Green Spring, Green Spring Run flows east where it reaches its confluence with the North Branch Potomac shortly before the North Branch joins with the South Branch Potomac River to form the Potomac River.

According to the Geographic Names Information System, Green Spring Run has also been known as Greenspring Creek.

See also
List of rivers of West Virginia

References

Rivers of Hampshire County, West Virginia
Rivers of West Virginia
Tributaries of the Potomac River